Caroline Berg Eriksen (born 28 January 1987) is a Norwegian blogger. Berg Eriksen started her career as a model and as a journalist at the website side2.no. She studied journalism at Norges Kreative Fagskole.

In 2012, Eriksen published her first book, Fotballfrues Dagbok - Et år med Norges Største Blogger, about being a footballer's wife.

She is married to Lars Kristian Eriksen.

References

External links 
Official website

1987 births
Living people
Norwegian bloggers
Norwegian women bloggers